Bifunctional heparan sulfate N-deacetylase/N-sulfotransferase 1 is an enzyme. In humans, it is encoded by the NDST1 gene.

References

Further reading

Human proteins